Will Jones (June 30, 1896 – death unknown) was an American Negro league catcher between 1915 and 1920. 

A native of Dayton, Tennessee, Jones made his Negro leagues debut in 1915 for the Louisville White Sox and Chicago American Giants. He went on to play for the St. Louis Giants, and finished his career with the Chicago Giants in 1920.

References

External links
 and Baseball-Reference Black Baseball stats and Seamheads

1896 births
Place of death missing
Year of death missing
Chicago American Giants players
Chicago Giants players
Louisville White Sox (1914-1915) players
St. Louis Giants players
Baseball catchers
Baseball players from Tennessee
People from Dayton, Tennessee